Cándido Maya (born 22 October 1973) is a Cuban fencer. He competed in the individual sabre events at the 2000 and 2004 Summer Olympics.

References

External links
 

1973 births
Living people
Cuban male fencers
Olympic fencers of Cuba
Fencers at the 2000 Summer Olympics
Fencers at the 2004 Summer Olympics
Pan American Games medalists in fencing
Pan American Games gold medalists for Cuba
Pan American Games silver medalists for Cuba
Pan American Games bronze medalists for Cuba
Fencers at the 1999 Pan American Games
Medalists at the 1999 Pan American Games
20th-century Cuban people
21st-century Cuban people